Lobeck is a surname. Notable people with the surname include:

Armin K. Lobeck (1886–1958), American cartographer, geomorphologist and landscape artist
Christian Lobeck (1781–1860), German classical scholar
Charles O. Lobeck (1852–1920), American politician
Florian Lobeck, German naturalist